Michael Lloyd Piel (born September 21, 1965) is a former professional American football player who played defensive end for four seasons for the Los Angeles Rams. Played football at the University of Illinois, Urbana prior to becoming a professional. He suffered shoulder problems during much of his professional career.

References 

1965 births
Living people
People from Carmel-by-the-Sea, California
Players of American football from California
American football defensive ends
Illinois Fighting Illini football players
Los Angeles Rams players